The Dallas Farmers Market is a large public market located at 1010 S. Pearl Expressway in the Farmers Market District of downtown Dallas, Texas.

Today, the Dallas Farmers Market features three kinds of sellers: produce dealers, wholesale dealers and local farmers. Monthly yard sales, cooking classes, workshops, and seasonal festivals also take place throughout the year. Floral and garden vendors are located adjacent to the market.

Redevelopment 
For several years, the Dallas City Council Economic Development Committee has been in talks with developers. In early December 2013, plans were announced (subject to approval) for mixed-use residential and retail redevelopment of the area. Announced plans include tearing down Sheds 3 & 4, replacing them with retail space and roughly 300 residential units, and converting Shed 2 entirely to retail and a food pavilion. Shed 1, the only property still owned by the city, will house the remaining actual farmer's market, with an expected doubling of the number of stalls available to local farmers.

References

External links 
Dallas Farmers Market, City of Dallas

Dallas
Buildings and structures in Dallas